The Monroe Creek Formation is a geologic formation in South Dakota. It preserves fossils dating back to the Paleogene period.

Fossil content

Mammals

Carnivorans

Eulipotyphlans

Rodents

Ungulates

Reptiles

Squamates

See also

 List of fossiliferous stratigraphic units in South Dakota
 Paleontology in South Dakota

References

 

Paleogene geology of South Dakota
Paleogene geology of Nebraska
Paleogene geology of Wyoming